Ezekiel Ranieri Motta (born May 14, 1990) is a former American football safety who played for two seasons with the Atlanta Falcons of the National Football League (NFL). He was drafted by the Falcons in the seventh round of the 2013 NFL Draft. He played college football at Notre Dame.

High school career
Motta attended Vero Beach High School in Vero Beach, Florida, where he was teammates with Bryan Stork. He tallied 137 tackles including eight tackles for a loss and three sacks during senior campaign at Vero Beach High School, and was named first-team Class 6A all-state as a senior. He played in the U.S. Army All-American Bowl in San Antonio, Texas in 2009. Considered a four-star recruit by Rivals.com, he was rated the No.5 outside linebacker prospect in the nation. He accepted a scholarship offer from Notre Dame over offers from Auburn and Boston College.

College career
In 2009, Motta was one of three freshmen to play in every game. He mostly contributed primarily on special teams and also moved back and forth between outside linebacker and safety, and recorded 12 tackles. As a sophomore, he played in all 13 games, in which he started 8. He totalled 50 tackles (30 solo, 20 assisted) which ranked seventh on the team. He added one and a half tackles for loss, one fumble recovery, one interception and two pass breakups. In his junior season, he played in all 13 games, starting eight at safety. He tallied 40 tackles, one interception, one pass breakup, one forced fumble and one fumble recovery. In his final season, he tallied 77 total tackles, including 16 in the 2013 BCS National Championship Game against the Alabama Crimson Tide. He also had two tackles for loss, three pass break ups, four pass deflections and a fumble recovery.

Professional career

He was drafted by the Atlanta Falcons in the seventh round (244th overall) of the 2013 NFL Draft. He signed with the Falcons on May 17, 2013. On April 2, 2015, he was waived by the Falcons.
In 2017, Motta filed a personal-injury lawsuit against Falcons doctors over inadequate treatment.

References

External links

Atlanta Falcons bio
Notre Dame Fighting Irish bio

Living people
1990 births
American football safeties
Notre Dame Fighting Irish football players
People from Vero Beach, Florida
Players of American football from Florida
Atlanta Falcons players
Vero Beach High School alumni